Sri Peddamma Thalli Temple or Peddamma Gudi is a Hindu temple located at Jubilee Hills in Hyderabad, Telangana,India. It is very famous during the festive season of Bonaalu.

Location
This temple is located at Road no.55 of Jubilee Hills, Hyderabad, Telangana

Etymology
The word "Peddamma", which consists of two separate words Pedda and Amma, literally mean 'Mother of Mothers' or "The Supreme Mother". She is one of the 11 forms of Village Deities and is known as The Supreme most.

The Temple is a must-visit during the Bonaalu festival which occurs during June–July every year. People offer their prayers and sacrifices to The Mother round the year, and The Mother is known to shower her blessings on each and every devotee who offers her prayers.

The two mega events of this goddess namely Mahotsavam and Rathotsavam will be celebrated in February.

Deities in temple 

Peddamma temple has couple of small temples beside the main temple.

One is Lakshmi, Ganapati and Saraswathi temple and other is Naga Devatha temple

Devotees can offer only coconuts to Goddess, there are plenty of shops selling coconuts inside the temple.

Timings 

The temple is open from 6a.m. to 1p.m. and 3p.m. to 8p.m. from Monday to Saturday.

On Sundays, the temple is open from 6a.m. to 8:30p.m.

References

Hindu temples in Hyderabad, India